Luc Ferland is a Canadian politician, who was a Parti Québécois member of the National Assembly of Quebec for the riding of Ungava from 2007 to 2014.

Ferland attended the Université du Québec en Abitibi-Temiscamingue and obtained a degree in animation, and also studied at the Université du Québec à Chicoutimi in project management. He was the political aide of outgoing MNA Michel Létourneau. He was also the director of the CRD of Baie-James and a commissioner at the Baie James School Board.
 
Ferland was elected in Ungava in the 2007 elections succeeding Letourneau who was also representing the northern Quebec riding. He was named the PQ critic for northern development and aboriginal affairs.

Ferland ran unsuccessfully for the Bloc Quebecois in the riding of Abitibi—Baie-James—Nunavik—Eeyou in the federal election of 2015.

Electoral record

Abitibi—Baie-James—Nunavik—Eeyou

Ungava

^ Change is from redistributed results. CAQ change is from ADQ.

References

External links
 
 PQ webpage 

Parti Québécois MNAs
Living people
Université du Québec en Abitibi-Témiscamingue alumni
Bloc Québécois candidates for the Canadian House of Commons
Candidates in the 2015 Canadian federal election
Quebec candidates for Member of Parliament
Year of birth missing (living people)